Steven George McNeil Osborne  (born 1971) is a Scottish pianist who has performed concertos and solo recitals worldwide.

He was taught by Richard Beauchamp at St Mary's Music School in Edinburgh before going to the Royal Northern College of Music in Manchester to study under Renna Kellaway.  After graduating, Osborne went on to win first prize in the prestigious Clara Haskil International Piano Competition in Switzerland in 1991 and the Naumburg International Competition in New York in May 1997. In 1999 he was selected as BBC New Generation Artist in the first year of the scheme.

His recording career began when he was signed to Hyperion Records in 1998 and has resulted in bi-annual recordings. The first disc with the BBC Scottish Symphony Orchestra celebrated Osborne's Scottish musical heritage with a pairing of Sir Alexander Mackenzie's Scottish Concerto alongside Sir Donald Tovey's Piano Concerto in A, winning a BBC Music Magazine 'Best of the Year' and a Gramophone 'Critics Choice' award.  His subsequent disc was a recording of works by the contemporary Russian composer Nikolai Kapustin - including 13 of his 24 Preludes in Jazz Style – which won a Deutscher Schallplattenpreis.  The disc that brought Osborne to international attention was his recording of Olivier Messiaen's epic Vingt regards sur l'enfant-Jésus in 2002. His on-going contract with Hyperion has resulted in two Gramophone Awards (Britten's Piano Concerto in 2009, Mussorgsky and Prokofiev in 2013), two Schallplattenpreis awards (Rachmaninoff's 24 Preludes, and Britten's Complete Works for Piano and Orchestra) together with numerous nominations.

Concerto performances take Steven Osborne to orchestras all over the world, including the Yomiuri Nippon Symphony Orchestra, Berlin Symphony, Deutsches Symphonie-Orchester Berlin, Salzburg Mozarteum Orchestra, Finnish Radio Symphony Orchestra, Bergen Philharmonic Orchestra, Residentie Orkest, Sydney Symphony Orchestra, Hong Kong Philharmonic Orchestra and the Dallas Symphony Orchestra. With these orchestras he has collaborated with conductors including Christoph von Dohnányi, Alan Gilbert, Vladimir Ashkenazy, Ludovic Morlot, Leif Segerstam, Andrew Litton, Ingo Metzmacher, Vladimir Jurowski and Jukka-Pekka Saraste.

Steven Osborne has returned almost annually to the BBC Proms – where his programmes have ranged from Mahler's Des Knaben Wunderhorn with Alice Coote (2009), Rachmaninoff's 1st Piano Concerto (2010) with the Ulster Orchestra under Paul Watkins, to Falla's Nights in the Gardens of Spain (2011), Grieg's Piano Concerto with the BBC Philharmonic Orchestra under John Storgårds (2012), and Messiaen's Turangalîla-Symphonie with Valérie Hartmann-Claverie and the BBC Philharmonic Orchestra under Juanjo Mena (2015). At the Edinburgh Festival he has appeared both as a soloist and chamber musician performing with just a few of his long-term collaborators Christian Tetzlaff, Alban Gerhardt, Paul Lewis and Lisa Batiashvili. In July 2015, Steven was announced as the first ever Patron of Lammermuir Festival in time for his second appearance at the Festival in September of the same year.

Honours and awards 
In 2014 Osborne was elected a Fellow of the Royal Society of Edinburgh.

He was appointed an Officer of the Order of the British Empire (OBE) in the 2022 New Year Honours for services to music.

References

External links
Steven Osborne at Hyperion Records
Audio interview with Steven Osborne
Steven Osborne's website

1971 births
Living people
20th-century British male musicians
20th-century British musicians
21st-century British male musicians
20th-century British pianists
21st-century British pianists
20th-century classical pianists
21st-century classical pianists
20th-century Scottish musicians
21st-century Scottish musicians
Alumni of the Royal Northern College of Music
BBC Radio 3 New Generation Artists
British male pianists
Male classical pianists
Officers of the Order of the British Empire
People educated at St Mary's Music School
Scottish classical pianists